is a Japanese politician of the Liberal Democratic Party, a member of the House of Councillors in the Diet (national legislature). A native of Utsunomiya, Tochigi and graduate of Keio University, he was elected to the House of Councillors for the first time in 1992 after serving in the assembly of Tochigi Prefecture for three terms from 1983.

References

External links 
 

Members of the House of Councillors (Japan)
1946 births
Living people
People from Utsunomiya, Tochigi
Liberal Democratic Party (Japan) politicians
Keio University alumni